Responsible Future (AF) is an Icelandic political party. It was established on 27 July 2021. The party's formation was preceded by Jóhannes Loftsson's writings in 2020, in which he voiced very strong opposition to harsh disease control measures. The party ran in the 2021 parliamentary election advocating for legal proceedings against politicians involved in Iceland's disease prevention policies and greater public input into the allocation of radio fees in the name of freedom of expression.

2021 Althingi elections 
The party first ran in the 2021 parliamentary elections and candidacy was announced on 10th September 2021. The party originally intended to run in two constituencies, Reykjavík North and the South constituency, but due to few signatures, they could only run in Reykjavík North, which meant that the party's chairman, Jóhannes Loftsson, could not vote for the party in the election.
Responsible Future received 144 votes (0.1% support) and no elected MPs.

References 

Politics of Iceland
Political parties in Iceland
Political parties established in 2021
Anti-vaccination organizations
Vaccine hesitancy